The 2016–17 Regionalliga was the ninth season of the Regionalliga, the fifth under the new format, as the fourth tier of the German football league system.

Regionalliga Nord 
18 teams from the states of Bremen, Hamburg, Lower Saxony and Schleswig-Holstein competed in the fifth season of the reformed Regionalliga Nord; 15 teams were retained from last season and 3 were promoted from the Oberliga, namely 2015–16 Niedersachsenliga champions Lupo Martini Wolfsburg and promotion round winners SV Eichede, 2015–16 Schleswig-Holstein-Liga champions, and 1. FC Germania Egestorf/Langreder, Niedersachsenliga runners-up. The season started on 31 July 2016.

Top goalscorers 
.

Regionalliga Nordost 
18 teams from the states of Berlin, Brandenburg, Mecklenburg-Vorpommern, Saxony and Thuringia competed in the fifth season of the reformed Regionalliga Nordost; 15 teams were retained from the last season and 2 teams were promoted from the Oberliga. FC Energie Cottbus was relegated from the 2015–16 3. Liga. 1. FC Lokomotive Leipzig and FSV Union Fürstenwalde qualified by winning the NOFV-Oberliga Süd and the NOFV-Oberliga Nord respectively. The season started on 31 July 2016. The fixtures were published on 29 June 2016.

Top goalscorers 
.

Regionalliga West 
18 teams from North Rhine-Westphalia competed in the fifth season of the reformed Regionalliga West; 14 teams were retained from the last season and 4 were promoted from the Oberliga. Wuppertaler SV was promoted from the 2015–16 Oberliga Niederrhein, Sportfreunde Siegen and TSG Sprockhövel from the 2015–16 Oberliga Westfalen and Bonner SC from the 2015–16 Oberliga Mittelrhein. The season started on 29 July 2016. The fixtures were published on 5 July 2016.

Westphalia DFB-Pokal play-off
As the Westphalian Football and Athletics Association is one of three regional associations with the most participating teams in their league competitions, they were allowed to enter a second team for the 2017–18 DFB-Pokal (in addition to the Westphalian Cup winners). A play-off took place between the best-placed eligible (non-reserve) Westphalian team of the Regionalliga West, SG Wattenscheid, and the best-placed eligible team of the Oberliga Westfalen, TuS Erndtebrück, with the winners qualifying for the DFB-Pokal.

Top goalscorers 
.

Regionalliga Südwest 
19 teams from Baden-Württemberg, Hesse, Rhineland-Palatinate and Saarland competed in the fourth season of the Regionalliga Südwest; 13 teams were retained from last season and 4 were promoted from the Oberliga. VfB Stuttgart II and Stuttgarter Kickers were relegated from the 2015–16 3. Liga. TuS Koblenz was promoted from the 2015–16 Oberliga Rheinland-Pfalz/Saar, Teutonia Watzenborn-Steinberg from the 2015–16 Hessenliga and SSV Ulm 1846 from the 2015–16 Oberliga Baden-Württemberg. The runners-up of the other Oberligas had a playoff round which was won by FC Nöttingen. The season started on 5 August 2016. The fixtures were published on 5 July 2016.

Top goalscorers 
.

Regionalliga Bayern 
18 teams from Bavaria competed in the fifth season of the Regionalliga Bayern; 14 teams were retained from the last season and 4 were promoted from the Bayernliga. VfR Garching was promoted from the Bayernliga Süd and SV Seligenporten from the Bayernliga Nord. SpVgg Bayern Hof and TSV 1860 Rosenheim were also promoted as they beat SV Viktoria Aschaffenburg in the 2015–16 Bayernliga promotion playoff. The fixtures were published on 20 June 2016.

Top goalscorers 
.

Promotion play-offs
The draw for the 2016–17 promotion play-offs was held on 8 April, with another draw between the Regionalliga Südwest teams held on 5 May 2017.

Summary
The first legs were played on 28 May, and the second legs were played on 31 May and 1 June 2017.

|}

Matches
All times Central European Summer Time (UTC+2)

3–3 on aggregate. Carl Zeiss Jena won on away goals.

SpVgg Unterhaching won 5–2 on aggregate.

0–0 on aggregate. SV Meppen won 4–3 on penalties.

References

External links
 Regionalliga   DFB.de
 Regionalliga Nord  nordfv.de
 Regionalliga West  wdfv.de
 Regionalliga Bayern   bfv.de

2016-17
4
2016–17 in European fourth tier association football leagues